Helene Söderlund (born 9 May 1987) is a Swedish ski-orienteering competitor and World Champion. She won a gold medal in the relay at the 2009 World Ski Orienteering Championships, and medals in both the long, middle and sprint events.

At the Junior World Ski Orienteering Championships in Salzburg in 2007, she won a silver medal in the long distance, a bronze medal in the middle distance, a silver medal in the sprint, as well as being part of the Swedish winning team in the relay.

References

Swedish orienteers
Female orienteers
Ski-orienteers
Tour de Ski skiers
1987 births
Living people